Józef Franciszek Skrzek (born 2 July 1948 in Siemianowice, Silesia) is a Polish multi-instrumentalist, singer, and composer, an important figure in Polish rock.

Life
In his early career, Skrzek was associated with the groups Ślężanie, Ametysty and Breakout. In 1971, he created the progressive-rock group Silesian Blues Band (with Jerzy Piotrowski and Apostolis Anthimos) and also recorded for a time with Czesław Niemen.

He performed with a number of artist and ad hoc created bands, but mostly involved himself with theater and church music, as well as movie soundtracks. He is well-noted for his live performances not only on conventional concerts but also in a variety of other venues (e.g., his improvisations on summer solstice nights in Silesian Planetarium). Currently, he is a friend of the elementary school in his hometown (elementary school number 13 in Michalkowice) where he often plays or sings.

In 2012 together with Jarosław Pijarowski and his (:pl:Teatr Tworzenia) created the first Polish avantgarde oratorio "Terrarium"(:pl:Terrarium – Live in Bydgoszcz).

His younger brother, was also a notable Silesian musician.

Discography
 2020  Sny Powstańców with Krystian Migocz
 2019  :pl:Living After Life with Teatr Tworzenia
 2018  Miłość (LOVE) - Józef Skrzek & Henryk Jan Bator
 2017  Maria Kantata (live recording 7.10.2017 in Szt.Istvan Budapest
 2017  Around The Worls In Eighty Moogs (concert recordings (2003 - 2009))
 2017 Stories with Krzysztof Piasecki
 2017 "(:pl:Katharsis (A Small Victory))" with Theatre of Creation (:pl:Teatr Tworzenia) by Jarosław Pijarowski (Brain Active Records)
 2015 "(:pl:Requiem dla chwil minionych)" with Jarosław Pijarowski
 2015 "Tryptyk Bydgoski"  - the first part  - "Kościół"
 2014 "The Stratomusica Suite" with Przemysław Mieszko Rudź
 2014 "(:pl:Człowiek z Wysokiego Zamku (album))" with (:pl:Wladyslaw Komendarek), Jaroslaw Pijarowski, Jorgos Skolias (Brain Active Records)
 2013 "(:pl:The Dream Off Penderecki)" with Theatre of Creation (:pl:Teatr Tworzenia) by Jaroslaw Pijarowski (Brain Active Records)
 2013 "(:pl:Terrarium – Live in Bydgoszcz)" Józef Skrzek & Jaroslaw Pijarowski (Legacy Records) & (Brain Active Records)
 2013 "(:pl:Terrarium – Organ Works)" Józef Skrzek & Jaroslaw Pijarowski (Legacy Records) & (Brain Active Records)
 2009-09 "Koncert Żywiołów"	
 2009-03 "Czas dojrzewania"
 2008-05 "Józef Skrzek & Jan Skrzek "Dwa Braty" "
 2007-03 "La Tempete"
 2007 - "(:pl:Viator 1973-2007)"
 2007-11 "Tryptyk petersburski" (as guest with Roksana Wikaliuk, Misha Ogorodov, Sasza Ragazanov, Michał Gierjo)
 2006-07 "Maria z Magdali"
 2005-05 "Viator - Znak Pokoju"
 2005    "Planetarium" with Colin Bass
 2004-11 "Anthology 1974-2004" (SBB)
 2004-05 "Szczęśliwi z miasta N." (SBB)
 2003-11 "U stóp krzyża"
 2003-05 "Akustycznie"
 2003-05 "Kantata Maryjna"
 2003-05 "Epitafium Dusz - Koncert na cześć zaginionych..."
 2002-06 "Koncert Świętokrzyski"
 2001 "Jesteś, który jesteś"
 2001 "Dzwonią dzwoneczki, muzyka gra, a kolęda nadal trwa"
 1998 "Czas"
 1998 "Pokój Saren Piano"
 1998 "Warto żyć dla miłości" (Ks. Stanisław Puchała, Józef Skrzek, Michał Mitko)
 1997 "Pokój Saren"
 1997 "Kolędy"
 1997 "Anioł się zwiastuje"
 1997 "Kantata Maryjna - Live"
 1993 "Twój dom wschodzącego słońca"
 1993 "Piosenki ojca Aime Duvala" (Ks. Stanisław Puchała, Józef Skrzek, Michał Mitko)
 1990-10 "Wracam"
 1990 "Kolędowy czas" (Kiepurki and Józef Skrzek)
 1989 "(:pl:Live (album Józefa Skrzeka))"
 1987 "Kantata Maryjna"
 1985 "Podróż w krainę wyobraźni"
 1983 "Ambitus Extended"
 1981 "(:pl:Józefina (album))"
 1981 "Ogród Luizy" (with Halina Frąckowiak)
 1980 "Ojciec chrzestny Dominika"
 1979 "Pamiętnik Karoliny"
 1977 "Swing & Blues" (with Krzysztof Sadowski)

See also
List of noteworthy Polish people

External links
 Official website

References

1948 births
Living people
Polish musicians
Polish keyboardists
Silesian culture
People from Siemianowice Śląskie